Syntia Hikmat Salha (born 12 January 2003) is a Lebanese footballer who plays as a midfielder for Lebanese club BFA and the Lebanon national team.

Club career 
Salha scored 13 goals for Safa in the 2020–21 season, helping her side win their first league title as the league top scorer. She also finished the 2021–22 season as top scorer with 20 goals. Salha joined BFA on 24 September 2022.

International career 
Salha made her international debut for Lebanon on 8 April 2021, coming on as a substitute in a friendly game against Armenia. She scored her first two goals on 30 August, in a 5–1 win against Sudan. Salha was called up to represent Lebanon at the 2022 WAFF Women's Championship, helping her side finish runners-up.

Career statistics

International
Scores and results list Lebanon's goal tally first, score column indicates score after each Salha goal.

Honours 
Safa
 WAFF Women's Clubs Championship: 2022
 Lebanese Women's Football League: 2020–21

Lebanon U15
 WAFF U-15 Girls Championship: runner-up: 2018

Lebanon U18
 WAFF U-18 Girls Championship: 2019

Lebanon
 WAFF Women's Championship runner-up: 2022

Individual
 Lebanese Women's Football League top goalscorer: 2020–21, 2021–22

See also
 List of Lebanon women's international footballers

References

External links

 
 

2003 births
Living people
People from Baabda District
Lebanese women's footballers
Women's association football midfielders
Akhaa Ahli Aley FC (women) players
Safa WFC players
Beirut Football Academy players
Lebanese Women's Football League players
Lebanon women's youth international footballers
Lebanon women's international footballers